Sasman may refer to:

People
 Yagan Sasman, a South African footballer
 David Sasman, a founding leader of the National Party South Africa

Other uses
 Rural Municipality of Sasman No. 336, Saskatchewan, Canada
 An SAS-man, a member of the Special Air Service

See also